Mehrshad Momeni (born August 15, 1987) is an Iranian Professional footballer.

Club career
Momeni played with Esteghlal from 2009 to 2011. He started his professional career in PAS Hamedan.

Assists

Coaching career
In 2016, Mehrshad retired from playing in order to become a youth academy coach in Corona, California.

References

1987 births
Living people
Iranian footballers
Iranian expatriate footballers
Pas players
Esteghlal F.C. players
Orange County SC players
USL Championship players
Iranian expatriate sportspeople in the United States
Association football midfielders
Association football defenders